Man from Two Worlds is an album by American jazz drummer Chico Hamilton featuring performances recorded in 1963 for the Impulse! label. The CD reissue added four compositions from Hamilton's previous album Passin' Thru (1962) as bonus tracks.

Reception
The Allmusic review by Scott Yanow awarded the album 4½ stars and stated: "Although it tended to get overlooked at the time, one of drummer Chico Hamilton's finest groups was his 1962–1963 quartet/quintet...this band placed a stronger emphasis on melody and softer sounds than the more avant-garde groups of the time but still pushed away at musical boundaries".

Track listing
All compositions by Charles Lloyd except as indicated
 "Man from Two Worlds" - 5:53
 "Blues Medley: Little Sister's Dance/Shade Tree/Island Blue" - 3:20
 "Forest Flower: Sunrise/Sunset" - 10:11
 "Child's Play" - 3:44
 "Blues for O.T." - 4:34
 "Mallet Dance" - 4:49
 "Love Song to a Baby" - 3:47
 "Passin' Thru" – 8:16 (Bonus track on CD reissue)
 "Transfusion" – 2:42 (Bonus track on CD reissue)
 "Lady Gabor" (Gábor Szabó) – 13:15 (Bonus track on CD reissue)
 "Lonesome Child" – 5:41 (Bonus track on CD reissue)
Recorded at Rudy Van Gelder Studio in Englewood Cliffs, New Jersey on September 18, 1962 (tracks 8 & 9) and September 20, 1962 (tracks 10 & 11) and December 11, 1963 (tracks 1-7)

Personnel
Chico Hamilton – drums
Charles Lloyd – tenor saxophone, flute
Gábor Szabó – guitar
Albert Stinson – bass
George Bohanon – trombone (tracks 8-11)

References 

Impulse! Records albums
Chico Hamilton albums
1964 albums
Albums recorded at Van Gelder Studio
Albums produced by Bob Thiele